The 1995–96 Liga Artzit season saw Hapoel Tayibe win the title and become the first ever Arab club to be promoted to the top division. Hapoel Jerusalem were also promoted.

At the other end of the table, Shimshon Tel Aviv and Hapoel Kfar Shalem were relegated to Liga Alef.

Final table

References
Israel 1995/96 RSSSF
Final Table Ironi Ashdod 

Liga Artzit seasons
Israel
2